Marcos Neves de Souza (born May 22, 1988 in Paraíso do Tocantins) is a Brazilian footballer who played in the Argentine Primera División for Cerro Largo.

External links
 
 Profile at Tenfield Digital 

1988 births
Living people
Brazilian footballers
Association football forwards
Brazilian expatriate footballers
Cerro Largo F.C. players
Expatriate footballers in Uruguay
Expatriate footballers in China
Brazilian expatriate sportspeople in China
China League One players
Sportspeople from Tocantins